Sam Ratulangi University (abbreviated as ) is a state university in Manado, North Sulawesi, Indonesia.  It was established on September 14, 1965. The current rector is Prof. Dr. Ir. Ellen Joan Kumaat, M.Sc., DEA.

History
Sam Ratulangi University has evolved from local universities starting as far back as 1954. Pinaesaan University was begun on 1 October 1954 with only the Law Faculty. Then in 1957, Permesta University was started. These two smaller universities were merged to become the University of Manado in 1958, with four faculties: Law, Economics, Letters, and Political Science.

In 1961 the Ministry of Education  based on Ministerial Decree No.002/Sek/PU, recognized the newly named University of North and Central Sulawesi as a state university with seven faculties: Law, Medicine, Agriculture, Economics, Political Science, Letters and Education. After several changes and re-organizations, the university was renamed Sam Ratulangi University in 1965 based on Presidential Decree No. 277/1965. The new name was in honor of Dr. Gerungan Saul Samuel Jacob Ratulangi, renowned throughout Indonesia, but hailing from Manado, as a leader in education.

Initially, Unsrat had only seven faculties: Medicine, Agriculture, Animal Sciences, Law and Public Education, Economics, Political Science, and Engineering. In 1965, the Faculty of Letters which previously had private status was inaugurated into Unsrat. One year later, the Faculty of Fisheries was established in Tahuna. In 1982, the Faculty of Teaching and Education, Manado in Gorontalo switch to Faculty of Teaching and Education Unsrat in Gorontalo (then known as State University of Gorontalo). The postgraduate program established in 1985, followed by the Faculty of Mathematics and Science in 1998, and faculty of Public Health in 2009.

Faculties
The university consists of eleven faculties with one postgraduate program:
 Faculty of Medicine
 Faculty of Engineering
 Faculty of Agriculture
 Faculty of Animal Husbandry
 Faculty of Fishery and Marines
 Faculty of Economics and Business
 Faculty of Law
 Faculty of Social and Political Sciences
 Faculty of Humanities
 Faculty of Mathematics and Sciences
 Faculty of Public Health

Notable alumni
Monica Fransisca Antoinette Khonado – goodwill ambassador for the Ministry of Environment and Forestry of Indonesia, TV Presenter, TV commercial model, Miss Earth Indonesia 2021, Top 20 at the Miss Earth 2021 pageant.

See also
 Blue Choir of Sam Ratulangi University

References

Bibliography

External links
  Official site

Universities in Indonesia
Educational institutions established in 1965
Universities in North Sulawesi
Indonesian state universities
1965 establishments in Indonesia